The 1979 Cork Junior Hurling Championship was the 82nd staging of the Cork Junior Hurling Championship since its establishment by the Cork County Board.

On 11 November 1979, Tracton won the championship following a 4-12 to 1-06 defeat of Castletownroche in the final at Páirc Uí Chaoimh. This was their second championship title overall and their first title since 1957.

Results

Quarter-finals

Semi-finals

Final

References

Cork Junior Hurling Championship
Cork Junior Hurling Championship